Molly S. Bray is an American geneticist, currently the Susan T. Jastrow Human Ecology Chair for Excellence in Nutritional Sciences at University of Texas at Austin. Bray is a nationally recognized expert and a featured speaker on the genetics of obesity, energy balance, and exercise response. She is a Professor and chair in the Department of Nutritional Sciences at the University of Texas at Austin, with a master's degree in Exercise Physiology from the University of Houston and a PhD in Human and Molecular Genetics from the UT Graduate School of Biomedical Sciences. She also served as the former Director of the Heflin Center for Genomic Science Genomics Core Laboratory at the University of Alabama at Birmingham and the Children's Nutrition Research Center/Baylor College of Medicine Genetics Core Laboratory. Bray's research focuses on the relationship between energy balance and lifestyle factors such as exercise, nutrition, and circadian patterns of behavior. Her findings related to how the timing and quality of energy intake affect weight gain and metabolic health have been featured on national and international news programs and a myriad of websites and popular news media. Bray also currently leads one of the largest genetic studies of exercise adherence established to date, the Training Interventions and Genetics of Exercise Response (TIGER) study, with a total cohort of more than 3,700 individuals. Bray's research has included investigations of aerobic fitness and resting and exercise energy expenditure in children and adolescents, circadian studies of feeding and metabolic response, and clinical studies of morbidly obese adolescents undergoing bariatric surgery. Bray has published extensively in a wide range of peer-reviewed journals and her work has been featured in national and international scientific meetings.

References

Year of birth missing (living people)
Living people
American ecologists
Women ecologists
University of Texas at Austin faculty
University of Texas alumni